Lavrukhin is a Russian masculine surname, its feminine counterpart is Lavrukhina. Notable people with the surname include:

Natalia Lavrukhina (born 1987), Russian acrobatic gymnast

Russian-language surnames